Three Stories from the End of Everything is a Canadian short drama film, directed by Semi Chellas and released in 2000. The film centres on three characters who are coping with unrequited or lost love.

Its cast included Soo Garay, John Robinson, Lucas Denton and Kristen Ross.

The film premiered on September 9, 2000, at the 2000 Toronto International Film Festival.

It received a Genie Award nomination for Best Live Action Short Drama at the 22nd Genie Awards in 2002. In advance of the Genie Award ceremony on February 7, it was screened at the Bloor Cinema on January 27, as the opening film to a screening of Treed Murray.

References

External links
 

2000 films
2000 drama films
2000 short films
Films directed by Semi Chellas
2000s English-language films
Canadian drama short films
2000s Canadian films